The Darfur Peace and Development Organization (DPDO) is a small Darfurian-run non-profit organization, based in the United States, that works toward reconciliation in the Darfur region of Sudan. It is committed to promoting and restoring peace and sustainable development in Darfur, Western Sudan, in Africa.

In operation since 2002, it is a non-sectarian organization with headquarters in Washington, DC, and offices in Khartoum and El Fasher Sudan. DPDO works to foster reconciliation, to facilitate just governance and to enable Darfurians to rebuild their homeland in effective, sustainable ways. It also promotes awareness of the crisis in the United States. Itse mission is to provide humanitarian relief for victims of the genocide in Darfur, to facilitate just governance, and to enable Darfurians to effectively rebuild and develop their homeland.

Non-profit organizations based in Alexandria, Virginia
Peace organizations based in the United States
Sudanese diaspora